Manchester is a census-designated place in Mendocino County, California, United States. The population was 159 at the 2020 census, down from 195 in 2010.

History
The Manchester post office opened in 1871, closed in 1876, and reopened in 1877. The place was named after Manchester, England, an early settler's former home.

Geography
Route 1 leads north  to Mendocino and south through Point Arena  to Bodega Bay.

It is bordered to the west by Manchester State Park.

Climate
The region experiences warm (but not hot) and dry summers, with no average monthly temperatures above .  According to the Köppen Climate Classification system, Manchester has a warm-summer Mediterranean climate, abbreviated "Csb" on climate maps.

Demographics
At the 2010 census Manchester had a population of 195. The racial makeup of Manchester was 151 (77.4%) White, 0 (0.0%) African American, 4 (2.1%) Native American, 1 (0.5%) Asian, 0 (0.0%) Pacific Islander, 29 (14.9%) from other races, and 10 (5.1%) from two or more races. Hispanic or Latino of any race were 48 people (24.6%).

The whole population lived in households; no one lived in non-institutionalized group quarters and no one was institutionalized.

There were 79 households; of these, 23 (29.1%) had children under the age of 18 living in them, 38 (48.1%) were opposite-sex married couples living together, 7 (8.9%) had a female householder with no husband present, and 4 (5.1%) had a male householder with no wife present.  There were 8 (10.1%) unmarried opposite-sex partnerships, and 1 (1.3%) same-sex married couples or partnerships. 25 households (31.6%) were one person and 7 (8.9%) had someone living alone who was 65 or older. The average household size was 2.47.  There were 49 families (62.0% of households); the average family size was 3.02.

The age distribution was 50 people (25.6%) under the age of 18, 12 people (6.2%) aged 18 to 24, 42 people (21.5%) aged 25 to 44, 60 people (30.8%) aged 45 to 64, and 31 people (15.9%) who were 65 or older.  The median age was 41.8 years. For every 100 females, there were 101.0 males.  For every 100 females age 18 and over, there were 107.1 males.

There were 104 housing units, at an average density of 39.7 per square mile; of the occupied units, 45 (57.0%) were owner-occupied and 34 (43.0%) were rented. The homeowner vacancy rate was 6.3%; the rental vacancy rate was 2.9%.  114 people (58.5% of the population) lived in owner-occupied housing units and 81 people (41.5%) lived in rental housing units.

Politics

References

Census-designated places in Mendocino County, California
Census-designated places in California